Guksu Station is a station on the Gyeongui-Jungang Line, located in the county of Yangpyeong. The station used to be the eastern terminus of the Gyeongui-Jungang Line. The line now extends further to Jipyeong Station to the east.

External links
 Station information from Korail

Metro stations in Yangpyeong County
Railway stations opened in 1939
Seoul Metropolitan Subway stations